Vladimir Verevkin (born 8 May 1987) is a Kyrgyzstani footballer who was banned for life from playing football in August 2019.

Career

Club
On 2 August 2019, the Asian Football Confederation announced that Verevkin had been banned for life for his involvement in a conspiracy to manipulate matches during Alay Osh's 2017 AFC Cup and 2018 AFC Cup campaign.

International
In the group stage of the 2006 AFC Challenge Cup, held in Bangladesh, Verevkin scored the opening goal to give Kyrgyzstan a 1–0 lead. The goal was important for Kyrgyzstan to get back on track after losing its opening game. However, Verevkin's goal never counted because the match was abandoned in the 76th minute due to heavy rain. The match was replayed from the begin on 7 April, which Kyrgyzstan won 2–0.

In the 2014 AFC Challenge Cup, Verevkin scored the only goal of the match against Myanmar, but the 1–0 victory was not enough to prevent Kyrgyzstan from being eliminated.

Career Stats

International goals
Scores and results list Kyrgyzstan's goal tally first.

References

External links
Player profile – doha-2006.com

1987 births
Living people
Sportspeople from Bishkek
Association football forwards
Kyrgyzstani footballers
Kyrgyzstan international footballers
Kyrgyzstani people of Russian descent
Footballers at the 2006 Asian Games
Asian Games competitors for Kyrgyzstan
Tajikistan Higher League players
Kyrgyz Premier League players